Canada Bread Company, Ltd. is a Canadian producer and distributor of packaged fresh bread and bakery products. The company operates 17 bakeries and employs over 4,800 employees across Canada.

Purchased by Grupo Bimbo (BIMBOA:Mexico) on May 23, 2014 for CAD$1.83 billion, Canada Bread is currently led by Alejandro Pintado, President, and operates as an independent business unit of the global baking company.

Logo
The logo is a combination of a "CB" (the company's initials), a Maple Leaf, and a wheat shoot. Designer: Phil Slous.

History

Canada Bread was founded in June 1911 following the merger of five of Canada's leading baking companies: Bredin Bread Company, Model Bakery (founded by George Weston), Toronto Bakery, Stuarts Limited and Boyd's Bakery. The founders of these bakeries agreed not to compete in bread for ten years. Weston and Stuart immediately formed new baking companies making biscuits and cakes. Weston Bakeries reentered the bread market in 1921, becoming over time a major competitor to Canada Bread.

Over a span of 30 years, the company quickly grew, purchasing over 20 bakeries in a dozen cities across the country and establishing new bakery locations in Kingston, Ontario, Cornwall, Ontario, Kirkland Lake, Ontario, Chatham, Ontario and Sudbury, Ontario. In 1968, the company acquired Dempster's Bread Limited, which had become the nation's best-selling brand of bread. It followed this acquisition in 1969 by changing the name of the company to Corporate Foods Limited, but later reverted to Canada Bread Company, Limited in 1997. Quebec-based Multi-Marques, with its brand POM, was acquired in 2001.

In May 2014, Canada Bread was purchased from Maple Leaf Foods by Mexican-based bakery organization, Grupo Bimbo. Less than a year later, in February 2015, Canada Bread acquired the bakery division of Saputo Inc., Vachon Bakery (which had purchased Stuart in 1979), for CAD$120 million. In March 2015, Canada Bread also acquired two former Sobeys bakeries located in Winnipeg, Manitoba and Calgary, Alberta in Western Canada.

In May 2016, Canada Bread announced it was closing its North Bay, Ontario location after nearly 50 years of operation in the city; to be divested across other Canada Bread locations.

References

External links
 

Bakeries of Canada
Grupo Bimbo brands
Grupo Bimbo subsidiaries
Canadian brands
Canadian subsidiaries of foreign companies
Food and drink companies established in 1911
1911 establishments in Canada